Djamel Eddine Chettal (born May 23, 1992) is an Algerian footballer who plays for the Tunisian Ligue Professionnelle 1 club CA Bizertin. He plays primarily as a winger.

Club career
In July 2014, Chettal signed a two-year contract with MO Béjaïa (MOB), joining the club on loan from USM Alger.

Honours

Club
USM Alger
 Algerian Ligue Professionnelle 1 (2): 2013-14, 2015-16
 Algerian Cup (1): 2013
 Algerian Super Cup (1): 2013
 UAFA Club Cup (1): 2013

MO Béjaïa
 Algerian Cup: 2015

References

External links

1992 births
Algerian footballers
Algerian expatriate footballers
Living people
People from Algiers
Footballers from Algiers
Algerian Ligue Professionnelle 1 players
Tunisian Ligue Professionnelle 1 players
USM Alger players
MO Béjaïa players
DRB Tadjenanet players
USM Bel Abbès players
CR Belouizdad players
CA Bizertin players
Association football wingers
Algerian expatriate sportspeople in Tunisia
Expatriate footballers in Tunisia
21st-century Algerian people